The Mei River (Chinese: 梅江; Pinyin: Méi Jiāng) is a river in Meizhou City in the eastern part of the Guangdong province in southern  China and a tributary of the Han River. Major bridges over it include the Jianying Memorial Bridge.

Rivers of Guangdong